Viktor Gustaf Balck KVO KCMG (25 April 1844 – 31 May 1928) was a Swedish Army officer and sports personality who was one of the original members of the International Olympic Committee, president of the International Skating Union for 30 years, the driving force behind the Nordic Games, and who is often called "the father of Swedish sports".

Military career

Balck was born in Karlskrona, Sweden, and was a sailor in his youth. In 1861, he joined the Swedish War Academy at Karlberg in Stockholm as an officer cadet of the Swedish Navy. After a while, he switched track to become a cadet for the Swedish Army, and was active in fencing and gymnastics. He stayed on as assistant gymnastics instructor at Karlberg for a while, and in 1866 was commissioned as a second lieutenant in the Närke Regiment. He was promoted to lieutenant in 1875, in the same regiment, and to captain in 1884.

However, Balck's military career came to be devoted almost entirely to gymnastics and sports. He was assistant instructor at Karlberg from 1868 to 1870, then gymnastics teacher at the Swedish Army Riding and Horse-Driving School at Strömsholm, 1870-1872. He became an instructor of military gymnastics and fencing at the Royal Central Gymnastics Institute in 1885, was chief instructor in the same subject, 1887-1909, and the Institute's director 1907-1909. He was promoted to major in the Swedish Army in 1894, to lieutenant colonel in 1900, and to colonel in 1904. In 1909 he transferred to the reserve list and in 1914 received an honorary promotion to major general.

Career as sports leader
Directly after completing his officer's training, Black studied the pedagogical, military and medical course at the Swedish Central Institute of Gymnastics 1866-1868, and stayed on as assistant teacher at the Institute 1868-1870, while also being an assistant teacher at Karlberg. From 1872, his main activities - both in military and civilian gymnastics and sports - had the Institute as a base.

As a young officer and gymnastics teacher, Balck was of the impression that voluntary gymnastics and sports activities in Sweden, i.e., outside the army and the schools, were undeveloped in comparison to the contemporary situation in many other countries. Determined to change this, from the 1870s he participated in the formation of several sporting clubs and organisations, and the founding of several related journals. During this time, Swedish organised sports took shape, and Balck became one of its leading figures.

International sports career

Balck also became involved in the emerging international sports movement at the end of the 19th century. In 1894 he became one of the original members of International Olympic Committee (IOC), and was one of two vice presidents of the Swedish Olympic Committee from 1913 to his death in 1928. He was also one of the leading figures behind the Nordic Games which were arranged from 1901.

Already in 1894 in IOC, Balck had proposed Stockholm as a venue for the Olympic Games. The official application to arrange the games came in 1908, and despite strong competition from Berlin, Stockholm were chosen to host the 1912 Summer Olympics with Balck a prominent member of the national organising committee.

He was also a president of the International Skating Union from 1894 and 1924. His ice skating career also included the construction of the "Balck skate".

In recognition of his international sports career, Balck was appointed as an honorary Knight Commander of the British Order of St Michael and St George, so in Britain he was styled as "Viktor Balck, KCMG".

Awards and decorations
Balck's awards:

Commander First Class of the Order of Vasa
Knight of the Order of Vasa
Commander of the Order of the Black Star with star
Knight Second Class of the Order of the Crown with star
Knight Second Class of the Order of Saint Stanislaus with star
Knight Commander of the Order of St Michael and St George (KCMG)
Commander of the Order of the Redeemer
Knight Second Class of the Order of the Red Eagle
Officer of the Legion of Honour
Knight of the Order of Leopold
Knight of the Order of the Dannebrog
Knight of the Order of the Crown of Italy
Knight of the Order of St. Olav
Knight of the Order of the Tower and Sword
Officier d'Académie

References

External links 

International Skating Union – Past Presidents at www.isu.org

1844 births
1928 deaths
International Olympic Committee members
Swedish sports executives and administrators
Swedish Army major generals
Honorary Knights Commander of the Order of St Michael and St George
People from Karlskrona
International Skating Union presidents
Commanders First Class of the Order of Vasa
Knights of the Order of Vasa
Swedish School of Sport and Health Sciences alumni